Bryan Charles Hollon (born June 22, 1974), better known by his stage name Boom Bip, is an American record producer and musician. He is one half of Neon Neon along with Gruff Rhys. He is based in Los Angeles, California.

Biography
Boom Bip started his career as a DJ while attending college in his hometown of Cincinnati, Ohio. In 1998, he released a collaborative EP with DJ Osiris, titled The Low End Sequence EP, on Mush Records. In 2000, he released a collaborative album with Doseone, titled Circle, on Mush Records. Boom Bip's debut solo studio album, Seed to Sun, was released on Lex Records in 2002. It featured guest appearances from Buck 65 and Doseone. In 2004, Boom Bip released a compilation album, Corymb, which included remixes by Boards of Canada, Venetian Snares, Clouddead, Lali Puna, Four Tet, and Mogwai, B-side tracks, and tracks from Peel Session.

Having moved to Silver Lake, Los Angeles, Boom Bip released his second solo studio album, Blue Eyed in the Red Room, on Lex Records in 2005. It featured guest appearances from Gruff Rhys and Nina Nastasia. In 2007, he released an EP, Sacchrilege. In 2011, Boom Bip released his third solo studio album, Zig Zaj, on Lex Records. It featured collaborations with Money Mark, Jenny Lee Lindberg, Josh Klinghoffer, Mike Noyce, Cate Le Bon, and Alex Kapranos. In 2013, he released a collaborative EP with Charlie White, titled Music for Sleeping Children.

Discography

Studio albums
 Circle (2000) 
 Seed to Sun (2002)
 Blue Eyed in the Red Room (2005)
 Zig Zaj (2011)
 Sun Choke (2016)
 Belief (2022)

Compilation albums
 Corymb (2004)

EPs
 The Low End Sequence EP (1998) 
 Doo Doo Breaks Volume 1 (2000)
 Doo Doo Tones Volume 1 (2002)
 From Left to Right (2003)
 Doo Doo Breaks Volume 2 (2003)
 Morning & a Day (2004)
 Sacchrilege (2007)
 Music for Sleeping Children (2013)

Singles
 "Mannequin Hand Trapdoor I Reminder" (2002)
 "28:06:42:12" (2004) 
 "Do's & Don'ts" (2005)

Productions
 Busdriver - "Kill Your Employer", "Sun Shower", "Kill Floor", and "Dream Catcher's Mitt" from RoadKillOvercoat (2007)

Remixes
 Smyglyssna - "We Can Fake It (Boom Bip Remix)" from We Can Fix It Remixes (2003)
 Amon Tobin - "Verbal (Boom Bip Remix)" from Verbal Remixes & Collaborations (2003)
 Super Furry Animals - "Father Father (Boom Bip Remix)" from Phantom Phorce (2004)
 Her Space Holiday - "The Luxury of Loneliness (Boom Bip Remix)" from The Young Machines Remixed (2004)
 Lali Puna - "Micronomic (Boom Bip Remix)" from I Thought I Was Over That: Rare, Remixed and B-Sides (2005)
 M83 - "Don't Save Us from the Flames (Boom Bip Remix)" (2005)
 Alias & Tarsier - "Plane That Draws a White Line (Boom Bip Remix)" from Plane That Draws a White Line (2006)
 Four Tet - "No More Mosquitoes (Boom Bip Remix)" from Remixes (2006)
 Editors - "An End Has a Start (Boom Bip Remix)" (2007)
 The Glitch Mob - "I Need My Memory Back (Boom Bip Remix)" from Love Death Immortality Remixes (2015)

References

External links
 Boom Bip at Mush Records
 Boom Bip at Lex Records
 

1974 births
Living people
Remixers
American hip hop DJs
Record producers from Ohio
People from Cincinnati
Lex Records artists
Mush Records artists
Neon Neon members